Andrea Foster (born 12 March 1997) is a Guyanese middle-distance runner competing primarily in the 800 metres. She represented her country at the 2015 World Championships in Beijing without advancing from the first round.

Competition record

Personal bests
Outdoor
800 metres – 2:12.53 (St. George's 2016)
1500 metres – 4:45.53 (St. George's 2015)

References

1997 births
Living people
Guyanese female middle-distance runners
Place of birth missing (living people)
World Athletics Championships athletes for Guyana